USS Menemsha (AG-39) was a cargo ship acquired by the U.S. Navy during World War II. She was used as a weather-gathering ship,  a patrol craft and convoy escort vessel in the North Atlantic Ocean. Although a Navy ship, she was operated by the U.S. Coast Guard, and eventually was transferred to that agency as USCGC Menemsha (WAG-274).

Built in Duluth, Minnesota
Ordered as the Menemsha (AG-39) was built and launched as the Lake Orange by McDougall Duluth Shipbuilding Company, Duluth, Minnesota, in 1918; purchased as John Gehm by the Maritime Commission from her owners, Bison Steamship Corp., Buffalo, New York, in 1941; acquired by the Navy 19 September 1941; renamed Menemsha and classified AG-39 on 15 October 1941; converted from a lake cargo hauler to a weather patrol ship by Maryland Drydock Company. Baltimore, Maryland; and commissioned under loan to the U.S. Coast Guard 20 January 1942.

World War II service 
Assigned to duty with the North Atlantic Weather Patrol, Menemsha patrolled various at sea weather stations out of Boston, Massachusetts, and Argentia, Newfoundland. Averaging about 3 weeks a patrol, she braved the perils of the storm tossed North Atlantic Ocean and the menace of German U-boats to gather valuable weather data from her isolated positions.

In addition, Menemsha maintained a constant alert for the enemy undersea raiders as well as for survivors from torpedoed ships. Menemsha returned the survivors to Boston 25 August.

Almost 1 year later, Menemsha, on a weather patrol, sighted a German submarine. As she steamed about midway between the Virginia Capes and the Azores on the moonlit night of 11 August 1943, her lookout spotted a surfaced sub, about 6,000 yards off her starboard bow. She closed for attack and began shelling the U-boat with 4 inch gunfire. During the next half-hour she chased the enemy which responded with "incoherent recognition signals" rather than with torpedoes or return fire. The determined weather patrol ship fired 20 rounds, one of which struck close aboard the fleeing sub's conning tower.

Menemsha broke off attack after suspecting the presence of other enemy U-boats in the area.

Transfer to the U.S. Coast Guard
The Navy transferred Menemsha to the Coast Guard 22 October 1943 and she was commissioned as USCGC Menemsha (WAG 274). Her name was struck from the Navy List 30 October 1943. After long and valuable service in the Coast Guard, she was scrapped in 1951.

References 
 
 NavSource Online: Service Ship Photo Archive - USS Menemsha (AG-39) - USCGC Menemsha (WAG-274)

Ships built in Duluth, Minnesota
Steamships of the United States Navy
World War II patrol vessels of the United States
Ships of the United States Coast Guard
1918 ships
Weather ships